Amy Nielsen is a Democratic member of the Iowa House of Representatives. She has represented the 77th district, which encompasses the cities of North Liberty, Tiffin, Oxford, Swisher, Shueyville, and Lone Tree as well as rural areas surrounding Iowa City to the west and south, since January 2017. Prior to her election to the House, she was Mayor of North Liberty from November 2014 to December 2016.

Early life, education, and career
Nielsen was born in Keokuk, Iowa, in 1978. Due to her father's job in the auto industry, the family moved to Tennessee for a brief time before relocating back to the Iowan community of Hills outside of Iowa City, where both of her parents ended up working for local banks. She attended Iowa City West High School, graduating in 1995. After two years at Kirkwood Community College, she and her husband left Iowa and began to move around the country for his job at Kimberly Clark.

Now a stay-at-home mother of three children, she and her family made it back to Iowa, settling down in the rapidly growing community of North Liberty. There, she began serving on the PTO of her children's school and worked on a revenue purpose campaign with the Iowa City School District. She headed multiple campaigns from local school board up to county commissioner and organized a "walking school bus" project for kids. Nielsen also sat on the board of directors for the North Liberty Community Pantry and served as member of the Iowa City Community School District's Equity Advisory Committee.

This experience motivated her to apply for a city council seat that had opened up upon the passing of North Liberty's mayor. Although she wasn't selected, she decided to run for mayor the following year. Despite her relative inexperience and her opponent's stellar record of 15 years public service, Nielsen won with 55% of the vote.

In 2015, when Sally Stutsman announced that she would not seek reelection, House leadership reached out to Nielsen, who initially declined. However, after reconsideration, she ultimately agreed and decided to launch a campaign around school funding. She ran against former Tiffin Mayor, Royce Phillips.

Electoral history

Political endorsement

She recorded a video in support of Cory 2020,

References

1978 births
Living people
Women state legislators in Iowa
People from Keokuk, Iowa
Iowa Democrats
Mayors of places in Iowa
Women mayors of places in Iowa
21st-century American politicians
21st-century American women politicians
People from Johnson County, Iowa
Iowa City West High School alumni